The Groupement tactique interarmes de Surobi (GTIA Surobi, "joint tactical group of Surobi"), also called Task Force Dragon, is a battalion-sized unit of the French Army, based in Surobi District, in Afghanistan. It operates in the framework of the French forces in Afghanistan.

Organisation 
GTIA Surobi comprises 
 a command component
 a support component (engineers, artillery, cavalry)
 3 armoured infantry sub-groups

From September 2010, the name "task force" is given up, and replaced by the name "battle-group".

The support unit provides fire support, engineering, communications, maintenance and medical support.

On 1 November 2009, command of the GTIA was transferred to the Brigade La Fayette.

See also 
 Groupement tactique interarmes de Kapisa
 Uzbin Valley ambush
 Operation Septentrion

References 

Ad hoc units and formations of the French Army